is a song by J-pop idol group Morning Musume, released as their second single on May 27, 1998 as an 8 cm CD. It sold a total of 417,330 copies. In 2004 It was re-released as part of the Early Single Box and again in 2005 as a 12 cm CD. Lead vocals of this single was Natsumi Abe. This single was also the debut of the "Second Generation" Morning Musume members Mari Yaguchi, Kei Yasuda and Sayaka Ichii, as well as the group's first single to be released under Zetima and distributed through Sony Music Japan's sub label Epic Records, as One Up Music (Zetima's former name) had ended its distribution deal with Warner Music Japan and adopted its current name after the release of the group's previous single "Morning Coffee".

Distribution rights for Zetima's catalog would be given to Sony for this single, Morning Musume's first album "First Time" and all of the Up-Front Works label's subsequent releases.

Track listing 
All songs written by Tsunku.

8 cm CD 
  – 3:49
 A Memory of Summer '98 – 3:58
  – 3:47

12 cm CD (Early Single Box and individual release) 
 
 A Memory of Summer '98

Members at time of single 
1st generation: Yuko Nakazawa, Aya Ishiguro, Kaori Iida, Natsumi Abe, Asuka Fukuda
2nd generation : Kei Yasuda, Mari Yaguchi, Sayaka Ichii

Oricon Rank and Sales

External links 
 Summer Night Town entry on the Up-Front Works official website

Morning Musume songs
Zetima Records singles
1998 singles
Songs written by Tsunku
Song recordings produced by Tsunku
1998 songs